Philadelphia is an unincorporated community in Sugar Creek Township, Hancock County, Indiana.

History
Philadelphia was laid out and platted in 1838. It took its name from Philadelphia, Pennsylvania, the "city of brotherly love". A post office was established at Philadelphia in 1838, and remained in operation until it was discontinued in 1907.

Geography

References

Unincorporated communities in Hancock County, Indiana
Unincorporated communities in Indiana
Indianapolis metropolitan area
Populated places established in 1838
1838 establishments in Indiana